The East Side News was a newspaper serving Portland in the U.S. state of Oregon, founded in 1906. It was financed by the Scripps-Canfield publishing house of Seattle, but in complete secrecy, due to a promise E. W. Scripps had made to Sam Jackson of the Oregon Journal, not to compete in the Portland market. In spite of low circulation in its early days, the News constructed a building on Clay St. at a cost of $50,000.

In 1931 the News purchased the Portland Telegram from C. H. Brockhagen, and merged the two papers to form the News-Telegram. According to Oregon newspaper historian George Turnbull, following the merger, the character of the consolidated paper reflected the News more than the Telegram, though the Telegram provided "a number of valuable staff members."

References

External links
 "Research with historical Portland newspapers, beyond the Oregonian" – Multnomah County Library

Defunct newspapers published in Oregon
Newspapers published in Portland, Oregon
1906 establishments in Oregon
Newspapers established in 1906
Daily newspapers published in the United States